Boletellus domingensis is a species of bolete fungus in the family Boletaceae. Found in the Dominican Republic, it was described as new to science in 2007.

References

External links

domingensis
Fungi described in 2007
Fungi of the Caribbean